William Webbe alias Kellowe (by 1466 – 1523), of Salisbury, was an English politician.

He was a Member (MP) of the Parliament of England for Salisbury in 1504 and 1510.

References

15th-century births
1523 deaths
People from Salisbury
English MPs 1504
English MPs 1510